Parkinson may refer to:

Parkinson (surname)
Parkinson (TV series), British chat show, presented by Sir Michael Parkinson
Parkinson, Queensland, suburb of Brisbane, Australia
The Parkinsons (fl. early 20th century), American father-and-son architects
The Parkinsons (band), a Portuguese punk rock band
 The Parkinsons, a broadcasting partnership of Sir Michael Parkinson and his wife Mary
 Donald Parkinson, founder and editor-in-chief of Cosmonaut Magazine

See also
Parkinson's (disambiguation)
Parkinson's disease, degenerative disorder of the central nervous system
Parkinsonism, also known as Parkinson's syndrome, atypical Parkinson's, or secondary Parkinson's
Parkinson's Law, the adage "Work expands so as to fill the time available for its completion."